Amperozide is an atypical antipsychotic of the diphenylbutylpiperazine class which acts as an antagonist at the 5-HT2A receptor. It does not block dopamine receptors as with most antipsychotic drugs, but does inhibit dopamine release, and alters the firing pattern of dopaminergic neurons. It was investigated for the treatment of schizophrenia in humans, but never adopted clinically. Its main use is instead in veterinary medicine, primarily in intensively farmed pigs, for decreasing aggression and stress and thereby increasing feeding and productivity.

Synthesis
According to Arvid Carlsson, behavioural Stimulation in rat:

The reaction of ethylisocyanate [109-90-0] (1) with N-benzylpiperazine (2) leads to the corresponding urea, CID:47103368 (3). Catalytic hydrogenation cleaves the benzyl protecting group giving N-ethylpiperazine-1-carboxamide [75529-72-5] (4). Alkylation of the unmasked nitrogen with 1,1'-(4-Chlorobutylidene)Bis(4-Fluorobenzene) [3312-04-7] (5) completed the synthesis of amperozide (6).

See also 
Other agents in the diphenylbutylpiperazine group include:
Difluanazine
Draflazine
FG-5893
Lidoflazine
Mioflazine

References 

5-HT2A antagonists
Piperazines
Ureas